Roy Pouw (born 7 June 1992) is a Dutch motorcycle racer. He won the Dutch 125cc Championship in 2010.

Career statistics

Grand Prix motorcycle racing

By season

Races by year
(key)

References

External links
 Profile on MotoGP.com

1992 births
Living people
Dutch motorcycle racers
125cc World Championship riders
21st-century Dutch people